Mindstorms: Children, Computers, and Powerful Ideas is a book by computer scientist Seymour Papert, in which he argues for the benefits of teaching computer literacy in primary and secondary education. It was published by Basic Books in 1980, and republished in a new edition by Basic Books in 1993.

The Lego Mindstorms programmable construction set system is named after the book.

In 2017, thanks to Papert's family the book was made freely available online here.

Papert describes the Turtle as an "object-to-think-with" and discusses many code examples of Turtle Graphics.

References

Books about education
1980 non-fiction books
Basic Books books